In Tamil Nadu, the Highways & Minor Ports Department (HMPD) is primarily responsible for construction and maintenance of roads including national highways, state highways and major district roads. HMPD was established as Highways Department (HD) in April 1946 and subsequently renamed on 30 October 2008. It operates through seven wings namely National Highways Wing, Construction & Maintenance Wing, NABARD and Rural Roads Wing, Projects Wing, Metro Wing, Tamil Nadu Road Sector Project Wing, Investigation and Designs Wing geographically spread across the state in 38 districts with about 120 divisions and 450 subdivisions.

Road Network
The various types of roads and their lengths are given below:

National Highways
Road stretches which have heavy traffic intensity of more than 30,000 Passenger Car Units (PCUs) connecting different state capitals, major ports, large industrial areas and tourist centers are designated National Highway by Government of India. In Tamil Nadu, National Highways Wing of Highways & Minor Ports Department was established in the year 1971 to look after the works of improving, maintaining and renewing of National Highways laid down by National Highways Authority of India (NHAI). National Highways wing exercises central government funds from Ministry of Road Transport and Highways for improvement works. Out of 25 National Highways in Tamil Nadu, 12 highways completely lie within the state. National Highways plying through Tamil Nadu are listed below in the table:

State highways 

Road stretches with heavy traffic intensity of more than 10,000 PCUs but less than 30,000 PCUs which connects district headquarters, important towns and the National Highways in the State and neighboring States are declared as State Highways. Construction & Maintenance wing of Highways Department looks after Construction, Maintenance of all the State Highways (SH), Major District Roads (MDR), Other District Roads (ODR). Tamil Nadu State Highways Network has 7 circles namely Chennai, Coimbatore, Madurai,  Tiruchirappalli, Salem, Tirunelveli and Villupuram.

Major District Roads

Roads with traffic density less than 10,000 PCUs but more than 5,000 PCUs are designated as Major District Roads (MDR). Major District Roads provide linkage between production and marketing centers within a district. It also provides connectivity for district and taluk headquarters with state highways and national highways. Construction and Maintenance wing of Highways Department executes construction and maintenance of MDRs along with State Highways.

Other District Roads (ODR)

Roads with traffic density less than 5,000 PCUs are categorized as Other District Roads (ODR). ODRs provides road connectivity for major rural production hubs, block headquarters and taluk headquarters. Similar to SH and MDRs, Construction and Maintenance wing of Highways Department executes ODR related works.

Rural & Sugarcane Roads
NABARD and Rural Roads Wing of Highways and Minor Ports Department carry out construction and maintenance of rural roads along with Pradhan Mantri Gram Sadak Yojana. NABARD and state government shares the funds required for the development of rural roads. In 2010, NABARD sanctioned  for augmentation of 508 rural roads in 30 districts, upgrading 44 district roads and 39 major district roads in 18 districts and construction of 121 bridges in 31 districts of the state.

Other Roads

East Coast Road

The East Coast Road was the first project implemented by Tamil Nadu Road Development Company (TNRDC) in the year 2002.

Coimbatore bypass
Coimbatore Bypass is a series of bypasses connecting the various National Highways and State Highways passing through and originating in Coimbatore. The first section of the bypass was a  two-laned road with paved shoulders built by Larsen & Toubro (L&T) from Neelambur to Madukkarai on National Highway 544 (formerly National Highway 47) which intersects Trichy Road at Chintamani Pudur near Irugur and Eachanari on Pollachi Road. It was the first road privatisation project to be implemented on a build-operate-transfer model in South India. The National Highways Authority of India is conducting studies for a bypass along the Mettupalayam–Sulur National Highways 81 and 181 (formerly National Highway 67). In 2010, an announcement was made in the State Budget to build a Western Ring Road at a cost of  2.84 billion for 26 km. The proposed road would have been from Madukarai near ACC Cement industry, starting on Palakkad Road connecting Mettupalayam Road via Perur Road, Marudamalai Road and Thadagam Road.

IT Expressway

Road Stretch from Madhya Kailash in Adyar to Mahabalipuram in Kanchipuram district which in turn connects with the East Coast Road is called Rajiv Gandhi Salai or IT Expressway. TNRDC developed this road stretch in two phases with widening of Madhya Kailash to Siruseri road stretch to six lanes in first phase and widening of Siruseri to Mamallapuram of road stretch I second phase.

Ennore-Manali Road Improvement Project (EMRIP) 
Ennore–Manali Road Improvement Project was developed by a special purpose vehicle formed by National Highways Authority of India (NHAI), Chennai Port Trust (CPT), Ennore Port Limited (EPL) and Tamil Nadu Government (GoTN) at a cost of Rs 600 crore.  The project was announced by the State Government in 1998 to cover industrial hotspots of north Chennai such as Manali Oil Refinery Road, Tiruvottiyur–Ponneri-Panchetti (TPP) Road, Ennore Expressway and northern portion of the Inner Ring Road from Madhavaram to Manali.

Chennai Port – Maduravoyal Expressway

The  Elevated Expressway project was awarded to Hyderabad based Soma Enterprises.

Outer Ring Road Project 

The 62-km long Outer Ring Road with six lanes from Vandalur to Minjur via Nemellichery was awarded to GMR consortium by Chennai Metropolitan Development Authority to implement the project on a Design, Build, Finance, Operate and Transfer (DBFOT) basis. It acts as a linkage between Grand Southern Trunk Road (NH-45), Bangalore–Chennai Road (NH 4) and Tirupathi–Chennai Road.

Chennai Peripheral Ring Road 

The proposed Chennai Peripheral Ring Road
starts at Ennore port travels through the proposed
Northern Port Access Road and connects
Mamallapuram near Poonjeri junction of East Coast
Road (ECR). The Government sanctioned
Rs. 10 Crore for the preparation of Detailed Project
Report (DPR) for this work and the same has been
completed.

References

External links 
 Government of Tamil Nadu – Highways Department
 Tamil Nadu Highways – Right to information (Chapter-02)
 Government of Tamil Nadu – Annual Road Plan 2008–09

 
State Highways
State Highways

ta:தமிழ்நாடு மாநில நெடுஞ்சாலைகள்